Thomas McGovern was an Irish professional footballer who played as a wing half and is best remembered for his time in the Southern League with Brentford, before, during and after the First World War. He also played in the Scottish League for Leith Athletic and in the Football League for Queens Park Rangers.

Honours 
Brentford
 London Combination: 1918–19

Career statistics

References

Year of death missing
Brentford F.C. players
English Football League players
1888 births
Leith Athletic F.C. players
Association football wing halves
Halifax Town A.F.C. players
Queens Park Rangers F.C. players
Date of death missing
Southern Football League players
Republic of Ireland association footballers
Sportspeople from County Roscommon